Indian Run is a  second-order stream (according to the Strahler stream order) entirely within East Brunswick Township, Schuylkill County Pennsylvania. The headwater are one-half mile south of Kepner and the stream flows west for 8 miles. The stream is an important trout spawning tributary to the Little Schuylkill River at Rauschs.

Tributaries
Note: These are local names not formally recognized
 Red Run
 Bear Run

See also
List of rivers of Pennsylvania

References

 New Ringgold 7.5 Minute Quadrangle, Department of the Interior, USGS.

Rivers of Pennsylvania
Tributaries of the Schuylkill River
Rivers of Schuylkill County, Pennsylvania